Current Pain and Headache Reports is a bimonthly peer-reviewed medical journal publishing review articles in the field of anesthesiology. It was established in 1994 as Current Review of Pain, obtaining its current name in 2001. It is published by Springer Science+Business Media and the editors-in-chief are Stephen D. Silberstein, MD (Thomas Jefferson University) and Lawrence C. Newman, MD, (NYU Langone Medical Center). According to the Journal Citation Reports, the journal has a 2018 impact factor of 2.767.

References

External links

Anesthesiology and palliative medicine journals
Springer Science+Business Media academic journals
Review journals
Bimonthly journals
Publications established in 1994
English-language journals